Manzoor Wassan (born 15 July 1957) is a Pakistani politician affiliated with the Pakistan Peoples Party (Parliamentarians) who was served as the Minister for Home Affairs of the province of Sindh, but currently he has been disqualified by The supreme court of Pakistan. Wassan is a lawyer by profession and hails from the city of Khairpur.

He has been a member of the Provincial Assembly of Sindh four times (1988–90; 90–93; 1997–99; 2008–present) and has previously also been a member of the National Assembly of Pakistan two times (1993–96 and 2002–2007).

References

1957 births
Living people
Pakistani lawyers
Pakistan People's Party politicians
People from Khairpur District
Sindhi people
Sindh MPAs 1988–1990
Sindh MPAs 1990–1993
Sindh MPAs 1997–1999
Sindh MPAs 2008–2013
Sindh MPAs 2013–2018
Pakistani MNAs 1993–1996
Pakistani MNAs 2002–2007